The 1955 Speedway National League was the 21st season and tenth post-war season of the highest tier of motorcycle speedway in Great Britain.

Summary
The league consisted of seven teams after the Harringay Racers ceased competitive speedway racing at the end of 1954. Match line-ups were reduced from eight riders to seven riders. Wimbledon won their second successive National League Championship. West Ham closed at the end of the season, blaming poor attendances.

Final table

Top Ten Riders (League only)

National Trophy Stage Two
The 1955 National Trophy was the 18th edition of the Knockout Cup. The Trophy consisted of two stages; stage one was for the second tier clubs, stage two was for the top tier clubs. Norwich won the second and final stage and were therefore declared the 1955 National Trophy champions.

 For Stage One - see Stage One

First round

Semifinals

Final

First leg

Second leg

Norwich were National Trophy Champions, winning on aggregate 109–106.

See also
 List of United Kingdom Speedway League Champions
 Knockout Cup (speedway)

References

Speedway National League
1955 in speedway
Speedway National League